Veľký Čepčín is a village and municipality in Turčianske Teplice District in the Žilina Region of northern central Slovakia.

History
In historical records the village was first mentioned in 1262.

Geography
The municipality lies at an altitude of 470 metres and covers an area of 6.78 km². It has a population of about 215 people.

References

External links
Official homepage

Villages and municipalities in Turčianske Teplice District